The Stono River or Creek is a tidal channel in southeast South Carolina, located southwest of Charleston. The channel runs southwest to northeast between the mainland and Wadmalaw Island and Johns Island, from north Edisto River between Johns (West) and James (East) Islands. The Intracoastal Waterway runs through southwest–northeast section of the channel.

The Stono River is noted for the Stono Rebellion which started on September 9, 1739. Started by slaves from West Africa, likely from the Kingdom of Kongo, it became the largest slave uprising in the British mainland colonies prior to the American Revolution.

On June 20, 1779, it was also the site of the Battle of Stono Ferry during the American Revolution.

On January 30, 1863, as part of the American Civil War, a Confederate force captured the Union  steamer USS Isaac Smith in which 8 men died and a further 17 were wounded in crossfire.

Bridges 
 John F. Limehouse Memorial Bridge
 Paul J. Gelegotis Memorial Bridge

See also 
 Waterways forming and crossings of the Atlantic Intracoastal Waterway

References 

Rivers of South Carolina
Rivers of Berkeley County, South Carolina
Rivers of Charleston County, South Carolina